Pichuga is a rural locality (a selo) and the administrative center of Pichuzhinskoye Rural Settlement, Dubovsky District, Volgograd Oblast, Russia. The population was 1,349 as of 2010. There are 39 streets.

Geography 
Pichuga is located on the right bank of the Volga River, 17 km southwest of Dubovka (the district's administrative centre) by road. Chelyuskinets is the nearest rural locality.

References 

Rural localities in Dubovsky District, Volgograd Oblast